Colonel Fiqri Dine (5 May 1897 or 3 August 1897 – 26 November 1960) was Prime Minister of Albania under Nazi Germany government under Nazi Germany. He was the chieftain of the Dine clan from Debar.

Biography

Prime minister
Despite being chosen as the Prime minister of Albania, Dine was mainly influenced by Mehdi Frashëri and Abaz Kupi. Frashëri, using Dine's connection to the Legaliteti, requested that Kupi join the government. Kupi agreed after the Albanian partisans began attacking Kupi's territory. However, the Germans refused to accept Dine and Mehdi Frashëri's proposed cabinet or Frashëri's choice to succeed Fuat Dibra, who died in February, as Regent. Dine and Frasheri proposed that a Gheg coalition should be formed. The plan was to coordinate Ballist and Zogist strength and, in cooperation with the Germans, drive back the Communists. At the same time, they hoped to convince the Allies that they were acting on behalf of an independent Albania and therefore deserved, if not direct Allied support, at least a respite from active Allied resistance. Initial military operations against the partisans were seemingly quite successful. Germans and Zogist forces, without directly cooperating, managed to drive the partisans from Mati at the end of July. Mehmet Shehu forces that controlled Debar, forced the partisans to retreat for the time being. However, the Allied forces began dropping supplies to partisan territory and helping them rebuild a new offensive. The Ballist-Zogist gamble had failed. A series of ominous international events during the last days of August made it abundantly clear to even the most pro-German Albanians that the German occupation of Albania would soon end. The German elite within Albania grew wary of Dine and Frasheri. Martin Schliep and Josef Fitzthum where enraged after discovering Dine's contact with the Allies, replaced him with Ibrahim Biçakçiu on 29 August 1944. Dine was Prime minister for only 43 days.

After World War II

After the war Dine, together with Muharrem Bajraktari, worked for the Albanian Committee in Paris. Dine fled from Yugoslavia to Belgium, where he died on 26 November 1960, aged 63.

References

Government ministers of Albania
Prime Ministers of Albania
1897 births
1960 deaths
Balli Kombëtar
Albanian collaborators with Nazi Germany
Albanian anti-communists
People from Dibër (municipality)